Thomas Cook (India) Ltd. is an Indian travel agency, headquartered in Mumbai, India, providing travel services including Foreign Exchange, International and Domestic Holidays, Visas, Passports, Travel Insurance and MICE. Founded in 1881 by Thomas Cook, the founder of the now defunct British brand Thomas Cook & Son, who established its first office in India and eventually extended to over 233 locations, in 94 cities across India, Sri Lanka and Mauritius. Thomas Cook India is a subsidiary of Fairfax Financial Holdings Limited, through its wholly owned subsidiary, Fairbridge Capital (Mauritius) Limited, and its controlled affiliates which holds 67.63% of the company.

History 
Thomas Cook had many ventures including the invention of the world's package tour in 1841, the first pre-paid hotel coupon in 1868, creation of the first  holiday brochure in 1858, and conceptualization of the first Travellers Cheques in 1874.

In 1881, Thomas Cook started its India operations in Bombay (later renamed Mumbai), and in October 1978, saw it christened Thomas Cook (India) Ltd. The company made its first public issue in February 1983, and commenced operations in Mauritius in 2000. In the same year, they acquired the Sri Lanka business from Thomas Cook Overseas Ltd, UK.

In 2006, Thomas Cook India Limited acquired LKP Forex Limited and Travel Corporation (India) Pvt. Ltd. (TCI).

In May 2012, Fairbridge Capital (Mauritius) Limited acquired Thomas Cook India, and became a part of Fairfax Group, Canada.

In 2013, Thomas Cook India Limited acquired Quess Corp (formerly known as Ikya Group - HR, IT Services, Facilities Management, Food Services, Skill Development), and Sterling Holiday Resorts.

In 2015, Thomas Cook Lanka Pvt. Ltd. (a subsidiary of Thomas Cook India Limited) acquired Luxe Asia Pvt. Ltd., Sri Lanka, a regional Destination Management Company handling inbound tourists from globally generating markets to its destinations.  In the same year, TCIL announced the acquisition of Kuoni Travel (India) Private Limited, a travel operator in India, and Kuoni Travel (China) Limited, a travel operator in Hong Kong.

In September 2017, Thomas Cook acquired Tata Capital's forex and travel business. In the aftermath of the collapse of Thomas Cook in the UK, the Indian namesake was considering rebranding itself to avoid the negative perception caused by the collapse of the UK travel company.

Rebrand 2022 
At the end of 2022, Thomas Cook India rebranded the business with a new logo, replacing the 2001 – 2013 British logo.

References 

Indian travel websites
Travel and holiday companies of India
Companies established in 1881
Indian companies established in 1978
Companies based in Mumbai